Chamosite is the Fe2+end member of the chlorite group. A hydrous aluminium silicate of iron, which is produced in an environment of low to moderate grade of metamorphosed iron deposits, as gray or black crystals in oolitic iron ore. Like other chlorites, it is a product of the hydrothermal alteration of pyroxenes, amphiboles and biotite in igneous rock. The composition of chlorite is often related to that of the original igneous mineral so that more Fe-rich chlorites are commonly found as replacements of the Fe-rich ferromagnesian minerals (Deer et al., 1992).

History

In 1820, Pierre Bertier; a mineralogist and mining engineer from Nemours, France, discovered chamosite. The new mineral was found in an area of low to moderate grade metamorphosed iron deposit. Early chamosite (which are chlorites) stirred some controversy after they discovered to have possessed the structure of kaolin rather than chlorite. But further research proved that chamosite was largely in existence with another phyllosilicate called berthierine (which has a kaolin type structure) which was rather difficult to distinguish from chamosites. Chamosite is named after the municipality of Chamoson, between Sion and Martigny, the canton of Valais, Switzerland.

Structure

X-ray diffraction (XRD) indicates that the proportion of 7 Å B layers in bertherine-chamosite ranges from 5 to 28%, and chemical analysis by scanning electron microscope-energy-dispersive X-ray spectroscopy (SEM-EDS) indicates positive correlation between %B and Fe/(Fe + Mg) (Ryan and Hillier, 2002). The chamosite structure is very similar to typical chlorite in which they are alternated regular layers with tetrahedral and tri-octahedral components (Rivas Sanchez et al., 2006). Its 2:1 layer structure is similar to that of mica, with a basal spacing of 14 Å. (Rivas Sanchez et al., 2006). In most common chlorites, there are 12.0 octahedral cations per O20(OH)16 and approximately equivalent amounts of aluminium in tetrahedral and octahedral sites [e.g. the magnesia chlorite, clinochlore, (Mg10Al2)(Si6Al2O20)(OH)16] (Deer et al., 1992).

Physical properties

Chamosite has a laminar shape, sheets measure from 20 to 200 μm (Rivas Sanchez et al., 2006). Chamosite may be greenish gray or brown in color. The cleavage are length-slow, the orientation may be α ∧ c=small, β=b, γ ∧ α=small, optic plane= [0 10] (Heinrich, 1965) and has good cleavage on the {011} axis. It has a dull luster and grayish-green streak. Birefringence is much lower than that of the micas, illite, montmorillonite and vermiculite, and refractive indices are higher than those of kaolinite (Deer et al. 1992). The chamosite spectra shows the reflection d=7.18 Å (main value of the chlorite) and the reflection d=14.4 Å (that confirms the presence of chlorite) (Rivas Sanchez et al., 2006).

Geologic occurrence

Chamosite is a relatively uncommon mineral in nature. Since its discovery in Chamoson, only about 15 localities around the world are known to be associated with iron deposits. Chamosite may be found in occurrence with other chlorite minerals. In recent years, berthierine; a more abundant chlorite, was discovered in occurrence with chamosite in the iron deposit of Pena Colorada, Mexico. Chamosite is related to the beginning of a hydrothermal phase and occurs mainly in a mineralized breccia type stock-work in which it fills open spaces and replaces the hot rock through fissures (Rivas Sanchez et al., 2006). The Mamu-Nkporo formation in the locality of Okigwe, Nigeria was studied by Akande and Mucke (1993), and they concluded that the carbonate discovered with associated chamosite was formed in a shallow marine subtidal to intertidal environment developed during periods of rise and fall in sea level. Formation of chamosite bearing oolites record periods of increasing wave energy corresponding to storm conditions between quiet shallow marine sedimentation (Akande and Mucke, 1993). Chamosite is a mineral from which elements may be extracted for commercial purpose. Xuanwei City in Yunnan Province has one of the highest lung cancer mortality rates in China (Dai et al., 2008). This epidemic had long been blamed on hydrocarbons released from the burning of coal.  Dai et al. (2008) conducted a mineralogical and geochemical study of coal from two coal mines in this region, and identified chamosite as one of the main minerals in the coal. The chamosite was suspected as the main carcinogen for local high lung cancer incidence in Xuanwei.

References

Further reading

External links
http://webmineral.com/specimens/picshow.php?id=1654&target=Chamosite

Phyllosilicates
Iron(II) minerals